Louise Levesque, née Cavelier, (23 November 1703, Rouen – 18 May 1745, Paris) was an 18th-century French femme de lettres.

The daughter of a prosecutor at the parlement de Normandie, Louise Cavelier received a good education. At age 20, she married Levesque, a gendarme of the King whom she followed to Paris. Introduced to distinguished writers, these men of letters, of which she made her favorite company and who appreciated the scope of her mind, induced her to write. She therefore devoted her leisure reading and soon indulged herself to poetry. She tried her hand to most varied genres.

Works 
1731: Lettres et chansons de Céphise et d’Uranie, Paris, in-8° ;
1733: Célénie, histoire allégorique, Paris, 4 part. in-12 ;
1736: Le Minet, pièce comique et facétieuse, Paris, in-12 ;
1736: Lélia, ou Histoire de Carthage, Amsterdam, in-12 ;
1736: Judith, five-act opera, Paris, non performed because no composer accepted to write the music.
 Remarques critiques sur l’histoire de Don Quichotte ;
 L’Augustin, pièce grave et plusieurs pièces de vers dans les Amusements du cœur et de l’esprit ;
1736–1741: Le Siècle, ou les mémoires du Comte de Solinville, moral novel, La Haye, in-12 ;
1738: Sancho Pança, gouverneur, poème burlesque, Amsterdam, in-8° ;
1740: L’Auteur fortuné, comedy, Paris ;
1744: Le Prince des Aigues-Marines. Le Prince Invisible, contes, Paris, in-12 ;

Sources 
 Gabriel Lhéry, « Notice sur Louise Cavelier Levesque », Poètes normands, Éd. Louis-Henri Baratte, Paris, Amédée Bedelet, Martinon, Dutertre et Pilout, 1846.
 Pierre Larousse, Grand Dictionnaire universel du XIXe, vol. 10, Paris, Administration du grand Dictionnaire universel, (p. 445).
 Lévesque (Louise Cavelier, dame), in Biographie Universelle, Ancienne et Moderne... , vol. 24, Paris, 1819; copied in Théodore-Éloi Lebreton's Biographie Normande, vol. 12, Rouen, 1858, and Biographie Rouennaise, Rouen, 1865.

External links 
 Louise Levesque on data.bnf.fr

18th-century French dramatists and playwrights
18th-century French poets
18th-century French male writers
French women poets
Writers from Rouen
French women dramatists and playwrights
French opera librettists
Collectors of fairy tales
1703 births
1745 deaths
18th-century French women writers